Gazleh (also known as Qazleh and Qezeleh) is a village in Robat Rural District in the Central District of Khorramabad County, Lorestan Province, Iran. At the 2006 census its population was 52, in 10 families.

References 

Towns and villages in Khorramabad County